Hairul Syirhan (born 21 August 1995) is a Singaporean footballer who plays as a goalkeeper for S.League club Geylang International.

Club career 
Hairul started his career with the Geylang International Prime League squad and he is promoted to the S.League squad after impressing in the Prime League in the 2014 season.

In 2017, he was drafted to the Garena Young Lions squad.

International career 
Hairul was part of the initial National U21 team called up for the 2017 Southeast Asian Games.

Personal life
Hairul's father is Singapore's top golfer Mardan Mamat.

Career statistics

. Caps and goals may not be correct

 Young Lions are ineligible for qualification to AFC competitions in their respective leagues.

References

External links 

1996 births
Living people
Singaporean footballers
Association football goalkeepers
Singapore Premier League players
Young Lions FC players
Competitors at the 2017 Southeast Asian Games
Southeast Asian Games competitors for Singapore